Fir Craibe is a branch of the Fir Ol nEchmacht, one of the ancient peoples of Ireland.

The kingdom of the Fir Craibe extended from Limerick to the Palace of Fidach, a place thought to be located in north-eastern Aidhne. In later centuries the territory south of Aidhne, Thomond, would be annexed by Munster, which it is still counted as part of.

Sources
"Foras Feasa Éireann", Geoffrey Keating, 1636.
"Leabhar Mor nGenealach", Dubhaltach MacFhirbhisigh, 1649–1666.
"Ogyia", Ruaidhri O Flaithbheartaigh, 1684.
"The History of Mayo", T.H.Knox, 1908.

Kings of Connacht
Kingdoms of ancient Ireland